The former French Catholic diocese of Comminges existed at least from the sixth century, to the French Revolution. The seat of the bishops was at Saint-Bertrand-de-Comminges, now no more than a village, in the modern department of Haute-Garonne in south-west France. The territory of the old diocese now belongs to the archdiocese of Toulouse.  The name of Comminges was incorporated into the titulature of the archbishop of Toulouse on 19 January 1935.  He is now the archbishop of Toulouse-Saint Bertrand de Comminges-Rieux.

History

The earliest Bishop of Comminges  known by name is Suavis, who assisted at the Council of Agde in 506, along with thirty-four other bishops.  Sidonius Apollinaris, however, writes of the death of a bishop of Comminges in 473.

Among the bishops of Comminges were:

Bertrand of Comminges (1073–1123), grandson of William III, Count of Toulouse, previously archdeacon of Toulouse, who built the cathedral of Comminges and restored the town
Bertrand de Goth (1295–99), who became pope under the name of Clement V.
Bertrand de Cosnac (1352–72), created cardinal by Pope Gregory XI on 30 May 1371.
Amelius de Lautrec (1384–90), created cardinal on 12 July 1385 by Pope Clement VII of the Avignon Obedience.
Pierre de Foix (1422–64), cardinal from 1412–1413 to 1464.
Cardinal Amanieu d'Albret, who was Bishop of Comminges  (19 July 1499 – 1514, after 7 November)
Cardinal Carlo Carafa  (6 July 1556 – 4 March 1561),  nephew of Pope Paul IV, he was arrested, tried, and executed by strangulation on orders of Pope Pius IV. Carafa was never ordained a priest or consecrated a bishop.  He never took possession of his see.
Urbain de Saint-Gelais, who in 1586, without outside assistance and with the help of a cannon which he caused to be brought from Toulouse, captured the town from the Huguenots.

In the church of St. Bertrand of Comminges (The gothic church is of the 14th century), baptism was administered with peculiar ceremonies: the baptismal water was placed in a silver dove with wings displayed (a symbol of the Holy Spirit), and enclosed in a cupola surmounting the font; at the moment of baptizing the dove was lowered over the head of the child by a pulley, and through its open beak the baptismal water was poured (as though grace from heaven).

Bishops

To 1000

Suavis  506–? 
Presidius  533–? 
Amelius  549–? 
Rufin  584–588 
Abraham  788–? 
Involatus  879–?
Oriol  980–?
Bertrand Roger  990–?

1000–1300

Peter I. 1003–? 
Arnaud I. 1035–? 
William I. 1040–1055 
Bernhard II. 1056–? 
William II. 1068–? 
Olger (Ulger)  ?–1073?
Saint Bertrand  1073–1126 
Roger de Nuro  1126?–1153?
Arnaud Roger  1153–1176 
Arsius (Arsenius)  1179–1188 
Raymond Arnaud  1188–1205 
Sperague (Hisparigus) 1205–1206 
Adhémar du Châtel 1207–1209 
Garcias de Lorte 1210–1217 
Grimoard I. 1217–1240 
Arnaud III. Roger 1241–1260 
Guillaume III. d'Audiran 1260–1263 
Bertrand  de Miramont 1263–1286 
Bertrand de Got 1295–1299 
Boso de Salignac  1299–1315

1300–1500

Bernardus, O.P. (1316-1317)
Pierre Vital de Millario 1317–1318 
Scot de Linières 1318–1325 
Guillaume de Cun 1325–1336 
Hugues de Castillon 1336–1351 
Bertrand de Cosnac  1352–1371 (Cardinal from 1371) 
Guillaume  d'Espagne  6 June 1371 – 1382 
Amelius (Amelie) II. de Lautrec 1384–1390 (Cardinal from 1385) 
Menaud de Barbazan 1390–1421 
Pierre de Foix  7 August 1422 – 1451 (Cardinal from 1412 or 1413) 
Arnaud-Raymond V. d'Espagne 1451–146? 
Jean  de Foix 9 May 1466 – 1499

From 1500

Amanieu d'Albret  (19 July 1499 – 1514, after 7 November) (He never had possession).
Gaillard de l'Hospital 1502–1514 (contested election; Gaillard never received papal approval; he died in 1514) 
Louis Dourelle (Dourville)  8 January 1515 – 1523
Jean  de Mauléon  71 June 1523 – 1551 
Jean Bertrand 1551–1555 
Carlo Carafa, Administrator  1556–1561 (Cardinal, nephew of Pope Paul IV) (executed 6 March 1561)
Pierre  d'Albert 1561–1565 
Charles III de Bourbon 1569–1579 
Urbain de Saint-Gelais de Lansac 1580–1613 
Gilles de Souvray 1614–1623 
Barthélemy de Donnadieu de Griet 1625–1637 
Hugues II. de Labatut 1638–1644 
Gilbert de Choiseul Duplessis Praslin 1644–1671 
Louis de Rechiègne Voisin de Guron 1671–1693 
Louis-François de Brezay de Denon-Ville 1693–1710 
Olivier-Gabriel de Lubières du Bouchet 1710–1740 
Antoine de Lastic 1740–1763 
Charles-Antoine-Gabriel d'Osmond de Médavy 1763–1785 
Antoine Eustache d'Osmond 1785–1801 (resigned)

See also
 Catholic Church in France
 List of Catholic dioceses in France

References

Bibliography
  (Use with caution; obsolete)
  (in Latin)

Studies
 [hagiography]
 [author of the "Litany of Saint-Bertrand", and other devotional texts]

See also
 The Cathedral of Saint-Bertrand-de-Comminges
 Munoz, Sarah (2009), "Cathédrale de Saint-Bertrand-de-Comminges: Notice historique" (in French)

Comminges
Comminges